The Tejas-Rajdhani Express is a semi-high-speed train operated in India. Indian Railways started to upgrade Rajdhani coaches to Tejas coaches. This replaced its traditional LHB Rajdhani coaches. By using Tejas smart coach, Indian Railways aims to move to predictive maintenance instead of preventive maintenance.

On 15 February 2021,the  Agartala Rajdhani Express was upgraded with Tejas livery Sleeper coaches.

On 19 July 2021, the Mumbai Rajdhani Express was upgraded to Tejas class smart coaches.

On 1 September 2021 the Rajendra Nagar Patna Rajdhani Express was upgraded to Tejas rakes. This increased the speed of the train to 130 km/h. The train can travel at a top speed of 160 km/h. This made it Semi-High-speed rail.

On 12 December 2021 the August Kranti Rajdhani Express commenced its run with new Tejas rake from Mumbai Central from onwards.

Routes

References

Named passenger trains of India
Express trains in India
Railway services introduced in 2021
2021 establishments in India